Boiling Point is a 1999 British television documentary series on British chef Gordon Ramsay produced by Tim Graham and David Nath for London Weekend Television (LWT), and narrated by Jack Davenport. With each segment 30 minutes in length, the five-part series was broadcast 25 February 1999 – 25 March 1999 on Channel 4.

Chef Ramsay is closely followed during eight of the most intense months of his life as he opens his first (and now flagship) restaurant, Restaurant Gordon Ramsay, on Royal Hospital Road in Chelsea in September 1998. This establishment would ultimately earn him the highly prestigious (and rare) three Michelin Stars. It also covers his participation in the dinner made at the Palace of Versailles on 11 July 1998 to celebrate the closing of the 1998 World Cup and features young chefs Marcus Wareing and Mark Sargeant at the early stages of their careers, as well as mentor Marco Pierre White.

Boiling Point was the first mass exposure of Ramsay to television audiences, revealing his highly driven, impatient and hot-tempered personality which has become his trademark.

The series was followed-up in 2000 by a six-part LWT miniseries, Beyond Boiling Point, again produced by Graham (this time with Paul Denchfield and Lucy Leveugle) for LWT, which follows Ramsay as he copes with his celebrity status and juggles cooking with the ever increasing demands on his time from beyond the kitchen.

List of episodes

Episode 1
In the wake of his departure from A-Z Restaurants over the sacking of a chef, Ramsay opens his first restaurant. Gordon worries his hidden camera appearance in Britain's Most Unbearable Bosses will affect bookings, but after seeing the segment he predicts the furor will blow over quickly.  Ramsay makes an unforgettable impression on restaurant staff that he will not tolerate low standards, and fires a waiter for drinking water in plain view of diners.

Episode 2
It is October 1998, the restaurant is a month old.  Ramsay accepts £5,000 (later revealed to be £3,500) from the English Apples and Pears Association to demonstrate a Bramley apple recipe, but he secretly uses a Granny Smith apple base with a bit of Bramley puree, telling the camera the food critics won't know the difference.  Ramsay tries to impress Guardian food critic Matthew Fort in the dining room. Ramsay reacts to the media fallout from throwing Sunday Times  critic A. A. Gill out of the restaurant in response to earlier personal attacks on Ramsay.

Episode 3
Gordon fishes with Marco Pierre White, who confides to the camera about Gordon's highly competitive nature, which creeps into even the simplest things like fishing.  Ramsay's maitre d' Jean-Claude Breton spots staff from the Michelin Guide appearing for dinner, perhaps a sign of a coveted third Michelin star, and Ramsay banishes the camera crewmembers from the kitchen in order to perfect the service.

Episode 4
To celebrate the 1998 FIFA World Cup, MasterCard sponsors a dinner at Versailles in Paris.  Ramsay helps plan the event, in which no natural gas is allowed as a fire precaution. Ramsay has to cook with electric, which he hasn't done in years.  Dinner timing is held up by delays with makeup for a dance troupe, causing a cascade of failures that result in overcooking of all the sea bass.  Ramsay is disillusioned with the assembly-line nature of catering. He says he can't wait to get on the 8:30 a.m. train and return to his 14-table dining room where standards are maintained.

Episode 5
It is March 1999 and Episode 2 has aired, upsetting the apple association that had given Ramsay £3,500. There is a large protest group outside the restaurant; Ramsay goes in the basement and telephones his contacts for help, though the show fails to explain the outcome. Ramsay disciplines carelessness in his establishment: waiter Silva serves a table the wrong starters and is sacked; chef Mark neglects to send out starters and is sent out for a break; waiter Tom keeps getting down on the floor to clean something and Ramsay smacks his head.  In January 1999, Michelin is days away from releasing its new list, which could possibly make Ramsay the youngest three-star chef, displacing Ramsay's mentor Marco Pierre White.  Ramsay and Marco engage in a friendly rivalry seeking inside information on the announcement; soon an inside contact tells Ramsay there are no new three stars.

References 

Business-related television series in the United Kingdom
Channel 4 documentary series
English-language television shows
Food reality television series
Hospitality industry in the United Kingdom
1999 British television series debuts
1999 British television series endings
1990s British documentary television series
London Weekend Television shows
Television series by ITV Studios